Medford Island is a small island in the San Joaquin River delta, in California. It is part of San Joaquin County, and managed by Reclamation District 2041.

References

Islands of San Joaquin County, California
Islands of the Sacramento–San Joaquin River Delta
Islands of Northern California